Myriam Corinne Lamolle (born 23 August 1963) is a French rower. She competed in the women's lightweight double sculls event at the 1996 Summer Olympics.

References

External links
 

1963 births
Living people
French female rowers
Olympic rowers of France
Rowers at the 1996 Summer Olympics
Sportspeople from Albi